The Battle of Sant Esteve d'en Bas took place on 10 March 1695 in the Catalan front of the War of the Grand Alliance. It was fought between a column of French regular infantry under Brigadier Urbain Le Clerc de Juigné, governor of the nearby French-occupied Castellfollit de la Roca, and 16 companies of Catalan miquelets and several armed peasants at the orders of Ramon de Sala i Saçala, the veguer of the town of Vic. Juigné's force was in a punitive expedition to burn the village of Sant Esteve d'en Bas, whose inhabitants had refused to pay war contributions to the French army, when it was attacked by the Catalan militia and nearly destroyed in two separate engagements.

The first and more bloody fight took place at the wood of Malatosquera and the bridge of Sant Roc, where the French lost 500 men killed or wounded. Defeated, Juigné and his remaining troops fled to Olot, where they entrenched themselves in a convent. The Catalans forced the French to surrender by setting the building on fire. At the slight cost of 7 men killed and 5 wounded, the miquelets and peasants under Sala i Saçala killed 260 French soldiers and took 826 prisoners. Juigné was among the first. This French defeat was followed, just a month later, by the blockade by Spanish troops, miquelets and armed peasants, of the French garrisons of Castellfollit and Hostalric, which the French command decided to demolish and evacuate on July under the impossibility of keeping both positions.

Background

Catalonia was one of the main fronts of the Nine Years' War. However, lack of means and poor relations with the peasantry due to the Revolt of the Barretinas marked for the Spanish Viceroy of Catalonia, the Duke of Villahermosa, the early stage of the conflict. In 1689 the Admiral of Castile, Juan Gaspar Enríquez de Cabrera, said to the Spanish Council of State that "the best relief that Catalonia can have are the outer capabilities, what would be done from Flanders, from Milan and from Navarre". The French army under the Duke of Noailles, however, was also short of resources, and attrition warfare prevailed on the first four years of the war. In 1694, Louis XIV committed more resources to his army in Catalonia, and Noailles managed to break the Spanish defenses, defeating the Spanish army at the battle of Torroella, on the banks of the Ter river, and seizing the ports of Roses, Palamós and Cadaqués, and the important city of Girona.

In 1695 the French command found that the inhabitants of the areas occupied by the French army were reluctant to pay war contributions and started to oppose an organized and growingly successful resistance. During the winter of 1694-1695, the inhabitants of Calella repelled a punishment force of 800 or 1,000 French soldiers from the Blanes garrison and killed between 60 or 100 of them. French troops were also harassed by Catalan militia forces, the miquelets, who laid ambushes to Noailles' forces from woods and heights. One of the most effective leaders of the miquelets was Captain Ramon de Sala i Saçala, the veguer of Vic, who achieved two victories over the French during the winter: on late December he overran a convoy on way to Hostalric, killing 25 French soldiers and taking 25 prisoners, and on 24 February he defeated a company of French dragoons at Navata, killing 7 of them and taking 28 prisoners and 32 horses.

One of the villages that refused to pay the French was Sant Esteve d'en Bas. Despite a French party looted the place in punishment, the villagers still refused to obey. A force of 700 soldiers was dispatched on 28 December to arrest the aldermen, but they found the village abandoned and sacked it again, taking with them two priests as hostages. In March 1695, as the locals were still rebellious, Monsieur de Saint-Sylvestre, the French governor of Girona, ordered Brigadier Juigné, commander of the garrison of Castellfollit, to punish the village for the third time in command of 1,300 chosen men from his own garrison and those of Figueres, Banyoles and Besalú. These troops were taken from the German Alsace regiment, the Swiss Manuel and Schellenberg regiments, and the French Royal-Artillery regiment.  Philippe de Courcillon, a famous French diarist, labeled them as "of the best troops of that country".

Battle

The French force left Castellfollit 9 March on the evening, passed at some distance from Olot and spent the night at the palanca de Cudella, a ford on the Fluvià river. At dawn, some peasants and miquelets discovered them and sent a warning to Sant Esteve d'en Bas. Women and children sought shelter in the surrounding mountains, while the men prepared to fight off the French column. They also called for help Ramon de Sala i Saçala, who was at the nearby village of Sant Feliu de Pallerols, with Captains Josep Mas de Roda and Pere Baliart i Teula, recruiting men to raise three new companies of miquelets. In the meantime, Juigné reached la Vall d'en Bas –the Bas valley–, leaving a rearguard at El Mallol, and took positions on the hill of Puigpardines. From there, he dispatched a third of his force to burn Sant Esteve. The French troops had burned 16 buildings when Ramon de Sala ahead 8 companies of miquelets and Pere Baliart leading 8 others arrived to the village and forced them to flee to Juigné's position.

At the hill of Puigpardines, Juigné was being already harassed by 80 armed peasants of the local  –a type of militia–, when the arrival of Sala's, Mas' and Baliart's miquelets convinced him to withdraw. When they tried to cross back the Fluvià, however, they found the way blocked. Juigné decided then attempting to escape to Olot across the wood of Malatosquera and through the bridge of Sant Roc, but the Catalans anticipated him. Sala divided his miquelets in two groups of 300 men each one, and while Josep Mas de Roda, leading the first one, pursued and attacked the French troops across the wood, he blocked the bridge of Sant Roc ahead the second group. During the running fight under the trees Juigné's force lost 25 men and abandoned part of its ammunitions.

The French column, despite the harassment, managed to take control of the bridge and started to cross to the opposite bank of the Fluvià. The miquelets and armed peasants, however, fired on them from the south and killed up to 70 French soldiers. According to Charles Sévin, marquis de Quincy, a contemporary French artillery general and military historian of Louis XIV's reign, Juigné's corps was able to retreat to Olot in good order. On the other hand, the local 19th-century Catalan historian Esteve Paluzie i Cantalozella claimed that the French troops fled in disarray, leaving 150 prisoners to the Catalans, which they carried to Sant Esteve d'en Bas under a heavy escort.

Arriving to Olot, most of Juigné's force took positions inside the convent of El Carme, while 90 Swiss soldiers of the rear entrenched themselves inside the hospital of the village. While the Swiss troops promptly surrendered, the bulk of the French column, with Juigné himself, still held for two hours. The miquelets and peasants encircled the building and managed to open a gap in its walls, only to be repelled in the hand-to-hand fight, losing two men killed and one wounded. Sala's men then breached the wall of a chapel and stormed the convent again, but as the French were well clustered within, the assault was as well repelled. Sala ordered to set on fire the gates of the building, but the French walled the gap using stones and bricks. The Catalans managed to enter the building by setting on fire large amounts of pitch and sulfur on the two breaches they had opened. The fire and the smoke blinded and choked the French soldiers, which retreated to the convent's cloister. After that, Juigné, seriously wounded during the fight, requested terms and surrendered.

Aftermath
The French column surrendered on the promise that the officers would not be stripped, but they all remained as prisoners of war and surrendered their weapons and money to the Catalans. Juigné, with 136 other wounded soldiers and a German captain, remained in Olot to receive medical treatment, but he died shortly after. French losses amounted to 251 or 260 men killed –32 of them officers– and 826 prisoners, as opposed to 7 men killed and 5 wounded on the miquelets side. The figures are well known, as the French intendant of Girona, René Desgrigny, wrote a letter to Olot's aldermen asking for the number and rank of the prisoners to exchange them when possible. In this letter, Desgrigny noted that Monsieur Juigné was lucky to be dead, as the defeat would probably have cost him dearly. The 690 unscathed French prisoners were brought first to Vic and later to Barcelona, where they arrived on 15 March. Their entrance was seen by a large crowd and the Spanish Viceroy, the Marquis of Gastañaga.

In the weeks that followed the battle, the Spanish troops and local militia increased their pressure on Castellfollit's garrison. On 5 April, the Catalan miquelets, supported by five companies of dragoons and several peasants, defeated a party of French troops from Berga and Castellfollit, killing 60 soldiers and taking 200 prisoners. Noailles, then ill of rheumatism, ordered Lieutenant-general Saint-Sylvestre to assemble a supply convoy to relieve Castellfollit, which he put under an escort of 2,000 infantry and 600 cavalry. A corps of miquelets, Spanish dragoons and peasants led by Blai de Trinxeria attacked and defeated the convoy on 15 April. After that, the French garrisons of Castellfollit and Hostalric fell under an effective blockade. On 19 May, Saint-Sylvestre assembled an army of 8,000 infantry and 3,000 cavalry and relieved Hostalric, but Castellfollit remained blockaded. Noailles and his second in command were not in good terms: if Saint-Sylvestre advocated for demolishing and abandoning both Hostalric and Castellfollit, Noailles was not willing to give ground.

On late June, Louis XIV replaced Noailles for Louis Joseph, Duke of Vendôme. Noailles charged Saint-Sylvestre of incompetence and, as did with other high officers, of looting the country on his own benefit, which had put on arms the peasantry against the French army. On 8 July Vendôme led his troops before Castellfollit. Having expelled its population and eaten horses and mules, the French garrison, diminished by desertions, was in an unsustainable position, and Vendôme came to evacuate and demolish the fortress. After that, the French army took the way to Hostalric and demolished its defenses, returning to Girona on 28 July.

Notes

Bibliography
 
 
 
 
 
 

Conflicts in 1695
1695 in Spain
Battles of the Nine Years' War
Battles involving France
Battles involving Spain